was a son of Kyōgoku Takakiyo and a nominal vassal of the Azai clan. Following Ashikaga Yoshiteru's murder in 1565, Takayoshi attended to Ashikaga Yoshiaki. He fell out of favour with Oda Nobunaga after Ashikaga Yoshiaki's banishment from Kyoto in 1573.

Family
 Father: Kyōgoku Takakiyo
 Wife: Kyōgoku Maria
 Children:
 Kyōgoku Takatsugu by Kyōgoku Maria
 Kyōgoku Takatomo by Kyōgoku Maria
 Kyōgoku Tatsuko married Takeda Motoaki later become Toyotomi Hideyoshi's concubines by Kyōgoku Maria
 daughter married Ujiie Yukihiro
 Magdalena married Kutsuki Nobutsuna by Kyōgoku Maria

References

1508 births
1581 deaths
Kyōgoku clan